Vatnsdæla saga (Old Norse: Vatnsdœla saga) is one of the sagas of Icelanders.
The saga remains in manuscripts  AM 559 4to, written between 1686 and 1688,  and AM 942 4to, written between 1700 and 1782.  

Vatnsdæla  Saga is essentially a family chronicle probably written just after the middle of the thirteenth century. It relates to residents of Vatnsdalur, a valley that runs south from Húnaflói, a large bay in the north of Iceland.  The principal protagonist  is Ingemund  (Ingimundr Þorsteinsson) who fought for King Harald Fairhair of Norway at the  Battle of Hafrsfjord winning his friendship and an amulet. At the instigation of a sorceress, he moved to Iceland to settle at Vatnsdalur in  Húnaþing. 
The saga follows several generations of his family until the arrival of Christianity in the late tenth century.

References

Other sources
 Jane Smiley  (2001) The Sagas of the Icelanders   (Penguin Classics)

External links
 "Proverbs of Vatnsdœla Saga and the Sword of Jokull: The Oral Backgrounds of Grettir Ásmundarson's Flawed Heroism" by Harris, Richard L. (2010) in  Essays in honor of George Clark, Robin Waugh and James Weldon (eds.), (Kalamazoo, MI: Medieval Institute Publications, Western Michigan University . pages 150 - 170. )
Proverbs in Vatnsdœla saga
Full text at the Icelandic Saga Database

Sagas of Icelanders